Ice Bar is a 2006 South Korean family film, directed by Yeo In-gwang and starring Park Ji-bin and Shin Ae-ra. It was released on August 24, 2006 in South Korea. The film won the best film award at the 21st Fukuoka International Film Festival in 2007.

Synopsis 
In 1969, Korea. Ten-year-old Young-rae (Park Ji-Bin) lives alone with his mother (Shin Ae Ra) in the countryside. Life is difficult for them and his mother is forced to illegally sell imported cosmetics on the street. But Young-rae is plucky and can stand up to anything including defending his mother — anything except when other kids call him names for being "fatherless." So when he hears that the father he had only dreamed of is alive and living in Seoul, he makes it his life goal to get to the city and find him. The only way to get there, however, is a long and expensive train ride. To raise money, Young-rae starts to sell ice cream bars.

Cast

Main 

 Park Ji-bin as Young-rae
 Shin Ae-ra as Young-rae's mother

Supporting 

 Jin Goo as In-baek, manager of the 'Ice Cake' factory 

 Hahm Eun-jung as Mi-sook

 Kim Ja Young as Suk Joon's mother
 Kwon Byung Gil as the teacher
 Lee Jae-ryong as Young Rae's father
 Ko Chang-seok as a cop
 Lee A-In as Cart owner's granddaughter
 Yang Joo Ho as Seung Il
 Kim Kyung-ran as Choon Ja's mother
 Kim Sun-Young as Choon Ja

Guests 

 Kang Sung Hae as Seok Soon's father
 Park Chang Ik as Seung Il's group member}
 Kim Young Sun as Mad woman
 Yoon Hee Chul as the CEO
 Uhm Hyun Kyung

Release 
Ice Bar premiered in South Korea on August 24, 2006. In February 2007, it was invited at 57th Berlin International Film Festival in 'Generation section'.

Home media
Streaming rights of the film were sold to online streaming services Naver, Amazon's Prime Video and AsianCrush among others.

Awards & nominations

References

External links 

 
 
 
 
 

2006 films
2006 drama films
2000s South Korean films
2000s Korean-language films
South Korean drama films